Caleb Rodney (April 29, 1767 – April 29, 1840) was an American merchant and politician from Lewes, in Sussex County, Delaware. He was a member of the Federalist Party, who served in the Delaware General Assembly and as Governor of Delaware.

Early life and family

Rodney was born in Lewes, Delaware, son of John and Ruth Hunn Rodney, brother of former Governor Daniel Rodney, and distantly related to President Caesar Rodney. He married Elizabeth West and had five children, Hannah, Hester, Penelope, Eliza, and Daniel. They were members of St. Peter's Episcopal Church in Lewes. He ran a store at the corner of 2nd and Market Streets there, the door to which was allegedly damaged in the British attack and is now on display at the Zwaanendael Museum in Lewes.

Professional and political career
Rodney served in the state house for four sessions from 1802 through 1805, when he was elected to the state senate and served for four more sessions from 1806 through 1809. He was back in the state house for two sessions in 1812 and 1813, and then returned to the state senate for one session in 1816. In October 1816, he ran for the U.S. Congress, but lost the election. So, the following year he was returned to his old seat in the state senate and served for five sessions from 1818 through 1822. He was the Speaker in the last two sessions and, therefore, became governor upon the death of Governor John Collins.
He then served as governor from April 23, 1822 until January 21, 1823.

Rodney was known as an opponent of slavery, expressing the desire that the institution could be ended through continued manumissions.

Death and legacy
Rodney died at Lewes, Delaware and is buried there, at St. Peter's Episcopal Church Cemetery. No known portrait of Caleb Rodney exists.

Almanac
Elections were held the first Tuesday of October. Members of the General Assembly took office the first Tuesday of January. State senators had a three-year term and state representatives had a one-year term. The governor takes office the third Tuesday of January and had a three-year term.

References

External links
Biographical Directory of the Governors of the United States
Delaware’s Governors

The Political Graveyard 

1767 births
1840 deaths
19th-century American Episcopalians
People from Lewes, Delaware
Businesspeople from Delaware
Delaware Federalists
Members of the Delaware House of Representatives
Delaware state senators
Governors of Delaware
Burials in Sussex County, Delaware
Federalist Party state governors of the United States
19th-century American politicians
18th-century American Episcopalians
18th-century American businesspeople
Rodney family of Delaware